State Road 276 (NM 276) is a state highway in the US state of New Mexico. NM 276's eastern terminus is at NM 105, and the western terminus is at the end of state maintenance by Lower Rociada.

Major intersections

See also

References

276
Transportation in San Miguel County, New Mexico